= H. McGuiness =

English footballer

Personal information
- Position: Forward

Senior career*
Years	Team	Apps	(Gls)
1888–1889	Bolton Wanderers	1	(1)
- * Club domestic league appearances and goals

H. McGuiness, was an English footballer who played in The Football League for Bolton Wanderers. H McGuiness played his one League match in the 3rd month of the inaugural Football League season of 1888–1889, November 1888. His debut and only top-flight game was on 10 November 1888, at Dudley Road, Wolverhampton, then home of Wolverhampton Wanderers. The match was played on the same day that then Leader of the Opposition, The Rt Hon William Gladstone, PC MP was speaking in Wolverhampton. In those days that would've been a major competition for those planning to go to a match. Bolton got off to a great start against one of the top teams of that era. They gained an early lead. However Wolves were too strong and were 2–1 up at half-time. The 2nd half was close and McGuiness, having missed earlier opportunities, put his side level. But Wolverhampton got the winner towards the end of the game. Bolton finished the season in 5th place. McGuiness' goal assisted Bolton to score 63 goals in 22 games, the 3rd highest of the season.
